Norman Cecil Kerr (19 April 1910 – 22 July 1995) was an Australian rules footballer who played with Fitzroy in the Victorian Football League (VFL).

Notes

External links 

1910 births
1995 deaths
Australian rules footballers from Victoria (Australia)
Fitzroy Football Club players